Richard Sunee (born 12 December 1966) is a Mauritian boxer. He competed in the men's flyweight event at the 1996 Summer Olympics.

References

External links
 

1966 births
Living people
Mauritian male boxers
Olympic boxers of Mauritius
Boxers at the 1996 Summer Olympics
Boxers at the 1998 Commonwealth Games
Commonwealth Games gold medallists for Mauritius
Commonwealth Games medallists in boxing
Place of birth missing (living people)
Flyweight boxers
Medallists at the 1998 Commonwealth Games